Brasidas is a genus that is native to the Philippines and is named after the Spartan general Brasidas

Characteristics 
The representatives of this genus correspond in the habitus typical representatives of the Obrimini and are similar in appearance to Obrimus species. A pair of very conspicuous holes or pits in the metasternum is characteristic of this genus. Similar indentations can otherwise only be found in the representatives of the genus Euobrimus. In egg-laying adult females, the abdomen in the middle is clearly thickened in height and width. A secondary ovipositor at the end of the abdomen surrounds the actual ovipositor. It is ventral formed from the eighth sternite, here named subgenital plate or operculum and dorsally from the eleventh tergum, which is referred to here as the supraanal plate or epiproct.

The species described so far are:

Way of life and reproduction 
The eggs are laid in the ground by the females with the ovipositor. Because of this construction, Brasidas eggs have a clearly recognizable opercular angle.

Taxonomy 

In 1939 James Abram Garfield Rehn and his son John William Holman Rehn published an extensive work in which, among other things, they established the genus Brasidas. In this they put two already known species, which up to then belonged to the genus Obrimus. They also described four new Brasidas species and a new subspecies. The newly described species Brasidas samarensis was defined as type species. The description of Brasidas acanthoderus was based on a female nymph.

The species described so far are:
 Brasidas acanthoderus Rehn, J.A.G. & Rehn, J.W.H., 1939
 Brasidas foveolatus (Redtenbacher, 1906)
 Brasidas montivagus Rehn, J.A.G. & Rehn, J.W.H., 1939
 Brasidas quadratipes (Bolívar, 1890)
 Brasidas samarensis Rehn, J.A.G. & Rehn, J.W.H., 1939
 Brasidas viscayanus Rehn, J.A.G. & Rehn, J.W.H., 1939

The genus Euobrimus, also described by Rehn and Rehn in 1939, is very similar to Brasidas. A common autapomorphic feature are the metasternal holes. Frank H. Hennemann et al mention the possibility that both genera could be synonymous to each other. This assumption was made by that of Sarah Bank et al research based on genetic analysis published in 2021 to clarify the phylogeny of the Heteropterygidae. The examined Euobrimus and Brasidas species were found in a common clade, but there are no separate clades that would justify the existence of two genera. In addition to Euobrimus and Brasidas, the genus Obrimus is also placed in their closer relationship.

Francis Seow-Choen and Ian Abercrombie found another, unspecified species of the genus near Valencia, Bukidnon on Mindanao in October 2012. According to its place of discovery it is called Brasidas sp. 'Bukidnon'.

Terraristic 
The genus is present through several representatives in the terrariums of lovers. The first species introduced in 2002 was Brasidas samarensis, which is managed by the Phasmid Study Group under PSG number 235. In 2008 Brasidas foveolatus was imported and assigned the PSG number 301.

Later (around 2010) further specimens were imported from the same origin as Brasidas foveolatus, namely from Nabunturan in Mindanao. They were initially named Brasidas sp. 'Nabunturan'. Whether these animals are representatives of another species has not yet been investigated.
In October 2011, Thierry Heitzmann, collected four pairs of another species on the island Rapu-Rapu. The very large animals were named after their place of discovery as Brasidas sp. 'Rapu-Rapu'. After three of the four couples died, the fourth female laid enough eggs to be able to send some to Europe. The Swiss Philipp Heller succeeded in hatching some animals from these in 2012, successfully breeding them and passing them on. According to Sarah Bank et al it is Euobrimus cavernosus.

Gallery

References

External links 
 
 

Phasmatodea
Phasmatodea genera
Phasmatodea of Asia